Indonesia is a unitary sovereign state and transcontinental country located mainly in Southeast Asia with some territories in Oceania. Indonesia's economy is the world's 16th largest by nominal GDP and the 8th largest by GDP at PPP, the largest in Southeast Asia, and is considered an emerging market and newly industrialised country. Indonesia has been a member of the United Nations since 1950. Indonesia was an organizer of the Bandung Conference and was the founder of Non-Aligned Movement; and also the founding member of Association of Southeast Asian Nations, Asia-Pacific Economic Cooperation, East Asia Summit, and Organisation of Islamic Cooperation. Indonesia is a member of the G20 major economies, OPEC, and World Trade Organization.

For further information on the types of business entities in this country and their abbreviations, see "Business entities in Indonesia".

Largest firms 

This list shows firms in the Fortune Global 500, which ranks firms by total revenues reported before March 31, 2017. Only the top five firms (if available) are included as a sample.

Notable firms 
This list includes notable companies with primary headquarters located in the country. The industry and sector follow the Industry Classification Benchmark taxonomy. Organizations which have ceased operations are included and noted as defunct.

See also 
 Economy of Indonesia

References

External links 
 Official page of the Indonesian Stock Exchange

Indonesia